Charles Stephen Haas (born October 22, 1952), also known as Charles Haas or Charlie Haas, is an American screenwriter, actor, and novelist.

Biography

Haas was born in Brooklyn, the son of Eunice (née Dillon) and Philip Haas, who was an attorney. Haas began his writing career with the film Over the Edge (1979).  It was co-written with Tim Hunter and starred Matt Dillon.  He later worked on Martians Go Home (1990) starring Randy Quaid.

At around this time he was approached to write the script to the film Gremlins 2: The New Batch (1990), which was directed by Joe Dante and produced by Michael Finnell.  Haas also had a small acting role in the film as one of the scientists.  Haas later took part in recording the DVD commentary for that film, and it was noted that it was Haas's idea to set that film in New York City.  Haas would later work with Dante and Finnell again, writing the script for and appearing in the film Matinee (1993), also work with Dante again on developing a script  titled Termite Terrace, based on Chuck Jones' start at Warner Brothers in the 1930s, the project ultimately never made it to the pre-production stages as Warner Bros. chose to make Space Jam instead.

Haas wrote the 2009 novel The Enthusiast, which was published by HarperCollins. He also wrote a humor piece for The New Yorker in April 2010. In 2022 he presented a new novel, Sunland, as twelve serialized episodes of The Last We Fake fiction podcast.

Filmography

Bibliography

References

External links

Spelunk, an excerpt from the novel The Enthusiast, Narrative Magazine.
The Last We Fake fiction podcast 

1952 births
Living people
American male screenwriters
The New Yorker people
People from Brooklyn
Screenwriters from New York (state)